Chery or Chéry is a surname. Notable people with the surname include:

 Cynthia Chéry (born 1994), Haitian footballer 
 Jason Chery (born 1985), American football wide receiver
 Monès Chéry (born 1981), Haitian footballer
 Tjaronn Chery (born 1988), Dutch footballer